Rowan Taylor (born 8 November 1984) is an international footballer from Montserrat who has two caps for the national team. Taylor, who was born in North London, England, plays as a striker for Cockfosters.

References

External links

Rowan Taylor at the Caribbean Football Database

1984 births
Living people
Footballers from Greater London
Montserratian footballers
Montserrat international footballers
English people of Montserratian descent
Cockfosters F.C. players
Association footballers not categorized by position